Guyotemaimetsha is an extinct genus of wasp which existed in France during the Cretaceous period. The only species is Guyotemaimetsha enigmatica.

References

Stephanoidea
Prehistoric Hymenoptera genera
Cretaceous insects
Prehistoric insects of Europe